Nordli is a Norwegian surname. Notable people with the surname include:

Endre Nordli, Norwegian handball player
Ernie Nordli (1912–1968), American animator
Irene Nordli (born 1967), Norwegian artist
Odvar Nordli (1927–2018), Norwegian politician

See also
Nordlie

Norwegian-language surnames